Sasanamigawa Dam is an arch dam located in Yamaguchi prefecture in Japan. The dam is used for power production. The catchment area of the dam is 91.5 km2. The dam impounds about 96  ha of land when full and can store 20100 thousand cubic meters of water. The construction of the dam was started on 1956 and completed in 1959.

References

Dams in Yamaguchi Prefecture
1959 establishments in Japan